Decoradrillia is a genus of sea snails, marine gastropod mollusks in the family Drilliidae.

Species
Species within the genus Decoradrillia include:
 Decoradrillia colorea Fallon, 2016
 Decoradrillia festiva Fallon, 2016
 Decoradrillia harlequina Fallon, 2016
 Decoradrillia interstincta Fallon, 2016
 Decoradrillia pulchella (Reeve, 1845)
Species brought into synonymy
 Decoradrillia halidorema (Schwengel, 1940): synonym of Decoradrillia pulchella (Reeve, 1845)

References

 Fallon P.J. (2016). Taxonomic review of tropical western Atlantic shallow water Drilliidae (Mollusca: Gastropoda: Conoidea) including descriptions of 100 new species. Zootaxa. 4090(1): 1-363

External links
 WMSDB - Worldwide Mollusc Species Data Base: family Drilliidae

 
Gastropod genera